Agardanda is a village in Murud Janjira Taluka, Raigad district, Maharashtra, India. Located 9 kilometers south of Murud, Agardanda is getting prominence because of the ongoing construction of Dighi port, which is just across the narrow creek. It is also an important transit hub to get across to Dighi, through ferries plying throughout the day at regular intervals.

Dighi port 
Dighi port is Located in Raigad district, the port is on the banks of the Rajpuri Creek on the west coast of India.It was acquired by Adani port and Special Economic Zone in Feb 2021 from the Balaji Group, Which had been granted a 50-years permit by the Maharashtra Maritime Board (MMB) to operate and develop the port. Dighi port is soon to be a major gateway of Maharashtra.It supplies Oil,Container and Bulk cargos.

Beach
It has an attractive beach presenting a panoramic view of the famous Janjira fort. Surrounded on three sides by the sea, Agardanda is tranquil and peaceful place covered in coconut and betel nut trees.

References

Villages in Raigad district